Kei Nishikori was the defending champion, but lost in the quarter-finals to Nicolás Almagro.
First-seeded Juan Martín del Potro won the title, defeating Milos Raonic in the final, 7–6(7–5), 7–5.

Seeds

Draw

Finals

Top half

Bottom half

Qualifying

Seeds

Qualifiers

Lucky losers

Qualifying draw

First qualifier

Second qualifier

Third qualifier

Fourth qualifier

External links
Main draw
Qualifying draw

Rakuten Japan Open Tennis Championships - Singles